Ewa Braun (born 2 August 1944) is a Polish Oscar winning set decorator, costume designer and production designer.

She has been working in production design since the 1960s. Her most famous productions are Europa, Europa (1990) by Agnieszka Holland, Schindler's List (1993) by Steven Spielberg (won Oscar shared with Allan Starski for Best Art Direction/Set Decoration) and Wielki tydzień (1995) by Andrzej Wajda.

References

External links

1944 births
Living people
Artists from Kraków
Best Art Direction Academy Award winners
Polish scenic designers
Polish women artists
Women graphic designers